Chand Chupa Badal Mein (English : The moon is hiding behind the clouds) is an Indian drama by Rajan Shahi's Director's Kut Productions. It premiered on 28 June 2010 and ended on 17 June 2011. It was directed by Rajan Shahi and Neeraj Baliyan.

Plot

Set in the beautiful hill town of Simla, Chand Chupa Badal Mein narrates the tale of a middle-class girl Nivedita Sharma a.k.a. Nivi, a.k.a. Putul. She is kind, sweet, responsible, but also nervous and reserved. She lost her mother when she was a little girl. Since then, she has been living with her grandmother, father and younger brother.

Nivedita meets her childhood friend Siddharth Sood after many years, and the two fall in love with each other. But on discovering that her cousin Divya also loves Siddharth, Nivi unhesitatingly sacrifices her love by pretending that she is indifferent to him. Under pressure from his family and hurt by Nivi's rejection, Siddharth marries Divya. And Nivi marries Siddharth's cousin Viren.

Later, it is revealed that Viren married Nivi to take revenge against Siddharth and his family. However, gradually both Nivi and Viren start caring for each other. When Nivi discovers Viren's real intentions, she transforms him and brings him closer to his family. Their lives take many more twists and turn from there. The shy Nivi blossoms into a confident woman with the help of Viren, meeting challenges with unshakable optimism.

Cast

Guests
Hina Khan
Karan Mehra
Adaa Khan

Production

Development
Poet and lyricist Javed Akhtar introduced the show with a recitation. He also lent his  voice to the promotions of the show. Some scenes were shot in the environs of Himachal Pradesh.

Filming
The story being based on backdrop of Shimla, a set of Shimla was created in 35,000 sq feet area in Mumbai Film City for shooting the series with about planting of 200 trees; the sets of mountains, streams and wooden cottages with rooms were also created to recreate Shimla. These all cost about ₹ 3 crores to construct.

References

StarPlus original programming
Indian television soap operas
2010 Indian television series debuts